Hemmen-Dodewaard is a railway station in the municipality Neder-Betuwe, Netherlands, located between the villages Hemmen and Dodewaard. The station opened on 1 November 1882 and is on the Elst–Dordrecht railway. Train services are operated by Arriva.

Train services

Bus services

There is no bus service at this station.

External links
NS website 
Dutch Public Transport journey planner 

Railway stations in Gelderland
Railway stations opened in 1882
Neder-Betuwe
1882 establishments in the Netherlands
Railway stations in the Netherlands opened in the 19th century